The Barbados women's national volleyball team represents Barbados.

References
NORCECA

Volleyball
National women's volleyball teams
Women's sport in Barbados
Volleyball in Barbados